Marcus Gilbert (born January 1, 1993 in Smyrna, Delaware) is an American professional basketball player. Previously, Gilbert played college basketball for Fairfield University where he was All-MAAC in 2015 and 2016.

Playing career

High school
Gilbert is a native of Smyrna, Delaware and attended the Academy of New Church in Bryn Athyn, Pennsylvania. As a senior, Gilbert averaged 17 points and 8 rebounds per game while leading his team to a 19–7 overall record and a 6–1 mark in conference play.

College
Gilbert played college basketball for Fairfield University in Fairfield, Connecticut from 2013 to 2016.  During his freshman season for the Fairfield Stags, Gilbert earned a spot on the MAAC All-Rookie team after being named MAAC rookie of the week three times.  Gilbert finished his career as one of the top basketball players in Fairfield history.  He scored 1,661 points which ranks fourth all-time, and hit 240 three-point field goals which ranks second all-time at Fairfield. Gilbert earned All-MAAC third team selection in 2015 and All-MAAC first team in 2016.  He also collected spots on the NABC Division I All-District 1 and All-Metropolitan Basketball Writers Association (MBWA) teams in 2016.

Professional
Gilbert participated in several NBA workouts including the Boston Celtics and Utah Jazz.  After going undrafted, Gilbert signed to play for Basket Ferentino in the Serie A2 Basket.

On August 7, 2017, Gilbert signed with FC Porto of the Liga Portuguesa de Basquetebol.

On July 9, 2018, Gilbert signed with Iberojet Palma of the LEB Oro.

On August 13, 2019, Gilbert signed with Ifaistos Limnou of the Greek Basket League. He averaged 5.3 points and 2.1 rebounds per game. On September 30, 2020, Gilbert signed with APOEL B.C. of the Cyprus Basketball Division A. He averaged 14.3 points, 5.2 rebounds, 2.0 assists and 1.2 steals per game. On February 12, 2022, Gilbert signed with the Tainan TSG GhostHawks of the T1 League.

References

External links
 Marcus Gilbert at fairfieldstags.com

1993 births
Living people
American expatriate basketball people in Cyprus
American expatriate basketball people in Greece
American expatriate basketball people in Italy
American expatriate basketball people in Portugal
American expatriate basketball people in Spain
American men's basketball players
Basketball players from Delaware
Basket Ferentino players
Fairfield Stags men's basketball players
FC Porto basketball players
Ifaistos Limnou B.C. players
People from Smyrna, Delaware
Small forwards
Sportspeople from the Delaware Valley
Viola Reggio Calabria players
American expatriate basketball people in Taiwan
Tainan TSG GhostHawks players
T1 League imports